Anthony Young (born September 8, 1962, in Anderson, South Carolina) is an American martial artist, teacher, and practitioner of the Goju Ryu Karate style and founder of the Tony Young All-Star Karate Academy. He is also a sport karate competitor.

Background
Tony Young began karate at the age of 12 and earned his Black Belt 4 years later. Tony Young is now an 10th degree Black Belt in the Goju Ryu style of karate. Tony Young was named the National Super Light Weight Karate Champion for 19 consecutive years. Tony Young has won over 1000 championship awards and prizes throughout his career.  In 1997, Tony Young retired from international and national competition to focus on community affairs, business, and tournament promotions.

In 1985 Tony Young opened the Tony Young All-Star Karate Academy. Young works with Public and Private Schools in the Atlanta area and developed working relations with Billy Blanks, who is the creator and owner of Tae-Bo Aerobics.

Competitive fighter
Rated the National Superlight Weight Karate Champion for 19 consecutive years by:
 The Regional Sport Karate Circuit
 The North American Sport Karate Association
 The All-Star Karate League
 World Association of Karate/Kickboxing Organization in the USA
 The OTOMOX Grand Slam Series

World champion
World Champion, International Sport Karate Association 1996, 1997
 World Champion, World Association of Karate/Kickboxing Team 1991 through 1997
 First Superlight weight fighter in Karate History to be rated Number one for all weight division
 US Open International World Champion, 1996
 Winner, Grand Champion Professional Karate Association
 Elected to Martial Arts Black Belt Hall of Fame
 Champion, North American Karate Conference
 Grand Champion of Professional Karate League
 First Superlight weight fighter in Karate history to win the overall fighting Grand Championship in a National Event
 Three time overall Men's National Fighting Champion
 Winner of the most consecutive Karate championships in the History of Sport Karate

Accomplishments

 Multi NASKA World Champion
 Multi WAKO World Champion inc.
 1993 W.A.K.O. World Championships in Atlantic City, USA  -63 kg (Semi-Contact)
 PKL National Champion
 Karate Illustrated Champion
 ISKA World Champion
 PKC World Champion
 PKA World Champion
 DOJO Champion
 SEKA Champion
 NAKC Champion
 IKC Hall of Fame 
 Southern Representative of WKC in the USA
 Inducted into the Battle of Atlanta Centurion Club
 Established the All-Star Karate League (ASKL) in 1989

References

External links
 Tony Young All-Star Karate Academy
  All-Star Karate League

1962 births
Living people
American male karateka
People from Anderson, South Carolina